Maccabi Segev Shalom, also called Maccabi Shaqib al-Salam, is an Israeli football club based in Shaqib al-Salam (Segev Shalom).

History
The club was founded in 2008 and played in Liga Gimel South division for its first two seasons, winning the divisional cup in its first season and finishing as runners-up in its second season.  Ahead of its third season, the South division was scrapped and the club was assigned to the Central division. The long distances to rival teams and the police refusal to allow the club to host matches In Shaqib al-Salam led to the collapse of the club and to its withdrawal from the league, after failing to appear to three matches.

Ahead of the 2012–13 the club was re-established and rejoined Liga Gimel. In 2015 the club won its division and was promoted to Liga Bet.

Honours

League

External links
Maccabi Segev Shalom The Israel Football Association

References

Segev Shalom
Segev Shalom
Association football clubs established in 2008
Association football clubs established in 2011
Association football clubs disestablished in 2012
Association football clubs disestablished in 2016
Bedouins in Israel